The Church of Our Lady of Lebanon is a Maronite (Eastern Catholic) parish church in the neighbourhood of Sayago, Montevideo, Uruguay.

Uruguay has a strong presence of Lebanese immigrants and their offspring. In 1888, some of them asked the Roman Catholic bishop Inocencio María Yéregui for permission to have their own sacraments celebrated by a Maronite priest. Since 1924, the Maronite Order of the Blessed Virgin Mary is also in Montevideo. Their own parish was established on 30 November 1941. The present temple was built in 1984–1986, designed by engineer Eladio Dieste; it is dedicated to Our Lady of Lebanon.

References

1941 establishments in Uruguay
Roman Catholic churches completed in 1986
Church buildings in Montevideo
Maronite church buildings
Eastern Catholic church buildings in Uruguay
Maronite Church in Uruguay
Lebanese immigration to Uruguay
Eladio Dieste buildings
20th-century Maronite Church church buildings
20th-century Roman Catholic church buildings in Uruguay